Hagerstown Historic District is a national historic district at Hagerstown, Washington County, Maryland, United States. The district contains the downtown commercial and governmental center as well as several surrounding urban residential neighborhoods and industrial areas. It includes the original plat of Hagerstown, laid out in the 1760s, as well as areas of expansion that developed generally prior to or just after the turn of the 20th century. Some 2,500 Confederate dead lie in Rose Hill Cemetery on South Potomac Street, most of whom died at the Battle of Antietam.

It was added to the National Register of Historic Places in 1994.

References

External links

, including photo from 1991, at Maryland Historical Trust
Boundary Map of the Hagerstown Historic District, Washington County, at Maryland Historical Trust

Historic districts in Washington County, Maryland
Hagerstown, Maryland
Historic districts on the National Register of Historic Places in Maryland
National Register of Historic Places in Washington County, Maryland